Oltedalsvatnet is a lake in the municipality of Gjesdal in Rogaland county, Norway. The  lake lies just south of the village of Oltedal. It is a reservoir along the river Oltedalsåna that is used to store water for the Oltedal Hydroelectric Power Station.

See also
List of lakes in Norway

References

Gjesdal
Lakes of Rogaland